Bjørn Ransve (born 16 December 1944) is a Norwegian painter and graphical artist. He was born in Oslo. He is represented in several art collections, including the National Gallery of Norway, Lillehammer Art Museum and the Norwegian Museum of Contemporary Art.

References

1944 births
Living people
Artists from Oslo
20th-century Norwegian painters
21st-century Norwegian painters
Norwegian male painters
20th-century Norwegian male artists
21st-century Norwegian male artists